Pata Zoo is a private zoo on the 6th and 7th floors of Pata Pinklao Department Store, Bang Yi Khan Subdistrict, Bang Phlat District, Bangkok between Borommaratchachonnani and Arun Amarin Intersections close to Phra Pinklao Bridge. Pata Zoo has operated since the beginning of 1983, along with the department store. For years it has been the focus of Thai animal rights activists who charge the zoo with inhumane treatment of animals.

Layout
The zoo is divided into two parts, upper and lower floor:

Sixth floor: Nocturnal animals, reptiles, and amphibians. Of interest are the many albino Burmese pythons, which the zoo is able to breed successfully. Also displaying specimen of giant freshwater stingray, the largest freshwater stingray in the world and an endangered species.
Seventh floor: Birds, orangutans and monkeys, penguins, guinea pigs and rabbits, goats and sheep, Asian black bears, sun bears, tigers, leopard cats, leopards and black panther, golden jackals, artificial waterfall and botanical garden. Featured here is a 30 year-old female eastern gorilla named Bua Noi (บัวน้อย, 'little lotus'), the only gorilla left in Thailand. Most critics of the Pata Zoo have focused on the living conditions of Bua Noi. She has been held captive in the zoo since 1987. The zoo veterinarian and zoo director insist that she is in good mental and physical health.

Public outrage
Animal rights activists submitted a petition of 35,000 signatures in September 2014 to Thailand's Department of National Parks, Wildlife and Plant Conservation (DNP) calling for the zoo's closure and the immediate removal of Bua Noi from the zoo. The DNP responded by declaring it could not withdraw the licence of Pata Zoo as the zoo had not done anything against the law. The DNP director-general argued that the Wildlife Conservation and Protection Act did not forbid animals from being caged in high-rise buildings and, therefore, Pata Zoo did not violate the law by maintaining a zoo on top of a building. The zoo immediately declared its innocence of any wrongdoing.

In March 2015, it was reported that Thai authorities charged that Pata Zoo had broken several laws and ordered the removal of all large animals, including Bua Noi, from the zoo. The zoo refused to free the gorilla and give her to another zoo. , Bua Noi was still in captivity at the zoo. Following a fire at the zoo later that year, Gillian Anderson and PETA wrote to the owner and asked that he, "reflect honestly on what life is like for animals there and to come to the decision to close it." At the end of 2020, Cher wrote a letter to Thailand’s environment minister, asking for him to “find it in his heart” to help her with her mission to release the gorilla.

References

External links
Facebook page 
Pata Zoo in Bangkok, Thailand (video)

Zoos in Thailand
Bang Phlat district
Zoos established in 1983
1983 establishments in Thailand